French Family Farm is a historic family farm located at Potsdam in St. Lawrence County, New York. The farmhouse was built in 1815 as a five bay house and extended to its present two bay, nine bay size by 1820.  It is a timber-framed structure with clapboard siding.  Also on the property is a barn built about 1900.

It was listed on the National Register of Historic Places in 1982.

References

Farms on the National Register of Historic Places in New York (state)
Houses completed in 1815
Houses in St. Lawrence County, New York
National Register of Historic Places in St. Lawrence County, New York
1815 establishments in New York (state)